Precession refers to a specific change in the direction of the rotation axis of a rotating object, in which the second  Euler angle (angle of nutation) is constant

Precession may refer to:

Precession, one of the Euler rotations
Axial precession or precession of the equinoxes, the precession of the Earth's axis of rotation
de Sitter precession, a general relativistic correction to the precession of a gyroscope near a large mass such as the Earth
Larmor precession, the precession of the magnetic moments of electrons, atomic nuclei, and atoms about an external magnetic field
Lense-Thirring precession, a general relativistic correction to the precession of a gyroscope near a large rotating mass such as the Earth
Phase precession, a pattern of neuronal firing in relation to local neuron populations
Precession (mechanical), the process of one part rotating with respect to another due to fretting between the two
Thomas precession, a special relativistic correction to the precession of a gyroscope in a rotating non-inertial frame
Apsidal precession, the rotation of the orbit of a celestial body

See also 
Axial tilt, the inclination angle of a planet's rotational axis in relation to a perpendicular to its orbital plane
Conventional International Origin, a conventionally defined reference axis of the pole's average location over the year 1900
Great year, the time required for one complete cycle of the precession of the equinoxes
Nutation, a slight irregular motion (etymologically a "nodding") in the axis of rotation of a largely axially symmetric object
Polar motion, the movement of Earth's rotation axis across its surface